The men's 110 metres hurdles event at the 2016 IAAF World U20 Championships was held at Zdzisław Krzyszkowiak Stadium on 20 and 21 July.

Medalists

Records

Results

Heats
Qualification: First 3 of each heat (Q) and the 3 fastest times (q) qualified for the semifinals.

Wind:Heat 1: -0.8 m/s, Heat 2: -0.1 m/s, Heat 3: +0.7 m/s, Heat 4: -0.1 m/s, Heat 5: +0.4 m/s, Heat 6: +0.6 m/s, Heat 7: 0.0 m/s

Semifinals
Qualification: First 2 of each heat (Q) and the 2 fastest times (q) qualified for the final.

Wind:Heat 1: +0.1 m/s, Heat 2: -0.1 m/s, Heat 3: +0.6 m/s

Final
Wind: +0.2 m/s

References

110 Metres hurdles
Sprint hurdles at the World Athletics U20 Championships